5x5 The Best Selection of 2002–2004 (stylized as 5×5 The Best Selection of 2002←2004) is the second compilation album of the Japanese boy band Arashi. As with the group's recent albums, two editions were released. The album contains all of the singles the band released from 2002 to 2004 as well as several album tracks. The regular edition contains a bonus track, while the limited edition contains a booklet and a DVD containing all of the music videos the group has released since 1999.

Album information
The release of the album coincided with the group's fifth anniversary. The limited edition exclusively contains a special music video of Arashi's "Lucky Man" song from their 2003 studio album How's It Going? while the regular edition exclusively contains the song "La Tormenta 2004", which translates into "The Storm 2004" from Spanish to English. "La Tormenta 2004" also serves as an updated version of "La Tormenta 2001" and "La Tormenta Chapter II", which the group performed in their Shounen Club appearance on July 15, 2001 and throughout their 2003 How's It Going? summer concert tour respectively.

Track list

Charts and certifications

Charts

Sales and certifications

Release history

References

External links
5x5 The Best Selection of 2002-2004 product information  
5x5 The Best Selection of 2002-2004 Oricon profile 

Arashi albums
2004 greatest hits albums
J Storm compilation albums